Saint-Denis is a railway station serving Saint-Denis, a northern suburb of Paris in Seine-Saint-Denis department, France. It is on the lines from Paris-Nord to Pontoise, Beauvais and Creil.

The station was the terminus of tramway T1 between 1992 and 2012 when the line was extended to Asnières–Gennevilliers–Les Courtilles. In 2014, a stop on tramway T8 was opened.

Gallery

External links

 
 

Railway stations in Seine-Saint-Denis
Réseau Express Régional stations
Railway stations in France opened in 1846
Saint-Denis, Seine-Saint-Denis